Elbeyli  (formerly İlbeyli) is a town in the Iznik district of Bursa Province, Turkey. The population of the town was 2608 as of 2012. The settlement was founded on the ancient settlement named Liada or Linda. According to the mayor’s web page its history goes back to at least three centuries. But there is no consensus on the origin of the name which was İlbeyli during the Ottoman era. The place name probably refers to the Turkmen tribe with the same name.

References 

Villages in İznik District